Paraguay TV is a Paraguayan television network. It is the first television station operated by the Paraguayan government, as well as the country's first digital channel. Experimental transmissions began on 15 August 2011, and regular scheduled programming began on 11 December.

History 
As part of the celebrations for the Bicentennial of the Independence of Paraguay, on May 14, 2011 the new Paraguayan state channel called "TV Pública Paraguay" was inaugurated, being the most modern channel in the country. The inauguration consisted of the first step for the launch of the television project that aired on August 15 of that same year. Between August 15 and December 11 of that same year, it maintained a provisional grid. On October 29 of the same year it had its first official broadcast, with live and direct monitoring of the XXI Ibero-American Summit held in Asunción (Paraguay), which could be seen on channel 14 (Analog) and channel 14.1 ( Digital) of DTT and for the whole world through its Intelsat satellite.

For December 10, 2011 being the second day of the meeting of State Communicators (ECOE), it began with the presentation of the channel's schedule, and also announced that it will go on air with its official broadcast starting on Monday 12 December of that year.

On August 16, 2013, the corporate image and name changed.

In December 2015, the state television station Paraguay TV was in charge of generating the signal and clean images freely and freely available for the XLIX Mercosur Summit for all national and international television media from the Confederation Convention Center. South American Soccer

In May 2016, Paraguay TV officially announced that it would be the only air channel to broadcast all the Copa América Centenario matches, from different cities in the United States. The signal was generated by Unicanal, which gave the broadcasting rights of the matches to Paraguay TV

In December 2016 and January 2017, in co-production with Telefuturo, the state channel was the Official Dakar Rally Channel, being the only Paraguayan channel to offer more than 100 hours of screen space dedicated exclusively to the competition.

Since October 13, 2017, the channel was available on Argentina's digital terrestrial television platform on dial 22.3 nationwide through the state-owned public company Radio y Televisión Argentina SE. Unlike the signal available in Paraguay Within the Argentine platform, the channel broadcast in the 4: 3 aspect ratio through pan and scan, which represents a loss of image since the lateral ends are cut off so that it can fit on a ray tube television cathodic.

Since mid-July 2018, the signal relay tower in the city near Asunción, San Lorenzo, was activated on channel 15 UHF virtual 32.2 and 32.3, causing great interference throughout the capital because it interfered with the Asunción signal. which in the same way transmits on virtual UHF channel 15 15.1 and 15.2 on DTT in that country.

On August 14, 2018, the signal ceased its broadcasts on the TDA Argentina platform, leaving its place vacant and for 9 months, the channel was replaced by Mirador.

References

External links 
  Official site

Television channels and stations established in 2011
Television stations in Paraguay
Publicly funded broadcasters
Spanish-language television stations
State media